Alan Sebastião Alexandre (born 8 February 1998), simply known as Alan Grafite, is a Brazilian footballer who plays as a striker for Vila Nova.

Career statistics

Honours
Chapecoense
Campeonato Catarinense: 2020
Campeonato Brasileiro Série B: 2020

References

External links

1998 births
Living people
People from Criciúma
Brazilian footballers
Association football forwards
Campeonato Brasileiro Série A players
Campeonato Brasileiro Série B players
Criciúma Esporte Clube players
Associação Chapecoense de Futebol players
Toledo Esporte Clube players
Concórdia Atlético Clube players
Vila Nova Futebol Clube players
Sportspeople from Santa Catarina (state)